Otto Carmichael House, also known as the Mary Louise Farm, is a historic home located at Muncie, Delaware County, Indiana. The original section was built in 1875, and later enlarged and remodeled in 1929.  It is a rambling -story, brick and frame dwelling Colonial Revival and Tudor Revival design elements.  It features steeply pitched gable roofs. It is associated with noted journalist and civic leader Otto Carmichael.

It was added to the National Register of Historic Places in 2000.

References

Houses on the National Register of Historic Places in Indiana
Colonial Revival architecture in Indiana
Tudor Revival architecture in Indiana
Houses completed in 1875
Houses in Muncie, Indiana
National Register of Historic Places in Muncie, Indiana